The 49th Biathlon World Championships was held from 9 to 19 February 2017 in Hochfilzen, Austria. There were a total of 11 competitions: sprint, pursuit, individual, mass start, and relay races for men and women, and mixed relay. All the events during this championships also count for the Biathlon World Cup season.

Host selection
The second candidate city was Östersund, Sweden. Hochfilzen was selected as the host city on  September 2, 2012 during the X IBU Congress in Merano, Italy (27 to 20 votes). This will be fourth time when World Championships will be held in Hochfilzen; the city had previously hosted the event in 1978, 1998 and 2005.

Schedule
All times are local (UTC+1).

Medal summary

Medal table

Top athletes
All athletes with two or more medals.

Men

Women

Mixed

References

External links
Official website
IBU

 
2017
2017 in biathlon
2017 in Austrian sport
International sports competitions hosted by Austria
Sport in Tyrol (state)
Biathlon competitions in Austria
February 2017 sports events in Europe